Huang Qun (born 10 April 1979) is a Chinese discus thrower.

She competed at the 2004 Olympic Games, but without reaching the final round.

From June 2006 to June 2008 she was suspended for a doping offense.

References

1979 births
Living people
Athletes (track and field) at the 2004 Summer Olympics
Chinese female discus throwers
Chinese sportspeople in doping cases
Doping cases in athletics
Olympic athletes of China
21st-century Chinese women